The 1995–96 snooker season was a series of snooker tournaments played between August 1995 and May 1996. The following table outlines the results for the ranking and the invitational events.


Calendar

Official rankings 

The top 16 of the world rankings, these players automatically played in the final rounds of the world ranking events and were invited for the Masters.

Notes

References

External links

1995
Season 1996
Season 1995